= Dimos Milonas =

Greek singer and actor

Dimos Milonas Δήμος Μυλωνάς
- Born: 12 April 1961 (age 63); Athens, Greece
- Genres: Comedy laïkó
- Occupation(s): Actor, Musician
- Labels: Epic Records (1993); Columbia Records (1995–1997)

Dimos Milonas (Greek: Δήμος Μυλωνάς) is a Greek singer and actor. He is most famous for his debut album "Είχα Πάει ... Λαϊκή!".

== Personal life ==
He is married to Fotini Constantinides since April 2018.

== Discography ==
=== Albums ===
Album name	Year	Label
Είχα Πάει ... Λαϊκή!	1993	Epic
Θα Τα Κάψω	1995	Columbia
Φιλιά Σε Όλους	1997	Columbia
